Arthur E. Rankin (July 24, 1888 – December 7, 1962) was an American teacher and politician.

Born near Dows, Iowa, in Morgan Township, Franklin County, Iowa, Rankin graduated from Dows High School. He served in the United States Navy during World War I. Rankin received his bachelor's degree from Drake University in 1914 and his master's degree from University of Iowa in 1931. Rankin taught in rural schools and was principal and superintendent of schools. From 1947 to 1951, Rankin served in the Iowa House of Representatives and was a Republican. From 1958 to 1962, Rankin served on the Hampton, Iowa City Council. He  then served as mayor of Hampton until his death. Rankin died in a hospital in Mason City, Iowa after a short illness.

Notes

1888 births
1962 deaths
People from Dows, Iowa
People from Hampton, Iowa
Drake University alumni
University of Iowa alumni
Educators from Iowa
Iowa city council members
Mayors of places in Iowa
Republican Party members of the Iowa House of Representatives
20th-century American politicians